Notes from China is a 1972 nonfiction book by Barbara Tuchman, based on her travels in China immediately following Richard Nixon's 1972 visit to China, depicting both rural and urban life in China during the Cultural Revolution under Mao Zedong. The book was one of Western audiences' first glimpses into post-Qing China.

References

1972 non-fiction books
Books about the Cultural Revolution
History books about China
1972 in China